The Arab newspapers industry started in the early 19th century with the American newspaper Kawkab America. ('Star of America') was an Arabic-language weekly (later daily) newspaper published in New York City, United States, it was the first Arabic-language newspaper in North America; it was founded by Najib Arbeely and Ibrahim Arbeely. between 1892 and 1908.

A
An-Nour Newspaper
The Arab American News
The Arab Voice
Arab Times (United States)

B
Beirut Times

H
Al-Hoda

K
Kawkab America

N
NOW News

See also

 List of Arab newspapers
 History of the Middle Eastern people in Metro Detroit

References
 Arabic media.com

External links 
 Pickyournewspaper الصحافة العربية.
 Arabic newspapers listed by country
 Arabic newspapers Online - الصحف و الجرائد باللغة العربية - Arabic newspapers listed by country
 Arabic newspapers Arab news
 Chronology of nineteenth century Arabic periodicals and periodicals in Arabic script, including information on holding institutions

Arabic-language newspapers published in the United States
Lists of newspapers published in the United States
Arabic